Michael Bacon may refer to:

Michael Bacon (musician) (born 1949), musician/composer who is part of the musical group The Bacon Brothers
Michael Bacon (artist) (born 1968), video game artist/producer/developer